Square brackets in mathematical equations [] may refer to:
 Precedence of operators
 Interval (mathematics)
 Commutator
 Iverson bracket
 Lie bracket of vector fields
 Matrix